In set theory, the complement of a set , often denoted by  (or ), is the set of elements not in .

Absolute complement

Definition 

Or formally:

Examples 
 Assume that the universe is the set of integers.
 Assume that the universe is the standard 52-card deck.
When the universe is the universe of sets described in formalized set theory, the absolute complement of a set is generally not itself a set, but rather a proper class.  For more info, see universal set.

Properties 
Let  and  be two sets in a universe . The following identities capture important properties of absolute complements:

De Morgan's laws:
 
 

Complement laws:
 
 
 
 
 
 (this follows from the equivalence of a conditional with its contrapositive).

Involution or double complement law:
 

Relationships between relative and absolute complements:
 
 

Relationship with a set difference:
 

Relative complement

Definition 

Formally:

Examples 
 
 

Properties 

The following identities capture notable properties of relative complements:

 
 
 
with the important special case  demonstrating that intersection can be expressed using only the relative complement operation.
 
 
 
 
 
 
 If , then .

Complementary relation 

Together with composition of relations and converse relations, complementary relations and the algebra of sets are the elementary operations of the calculus of relations.

LaTeX notation 

In the LaTeX typesetting language, the command \setminus is usually used for rendering a set difference symbol, which is similar to a backslash symbol. When rendered, the \setminus command looks identical to \backslash, except that it has a little more space in front and behind the slash, akin to the LaTeX sequence \mathbin{\backslash}. A variant \smallsetminus is available in the amssymb package. The symbol  (as opposed to ) is produced by \complement. (It corresponds to the Unicode symbol ∁.)

In programming languages 
Some programming languages have sets among their built in data structures. Such a data structure behaves as a finite set, that is, it consists of a finite number of data that are not specifically ordered, and may thus be considered as the elements of a set. In some cases, the elements are not necessary distinct, and the data structure codes multisets rather than sets. These programming languages have operators or functions for computing the complement and the set differences. 

These operators may generally be applied also to data structures that are not really mathematical sets, such as ordered lists or arrays. It follows that some programming languages may have a function called set_difference, even if they do not have any data structure for sets.

See also

Notes

References

External links
 
 

Basic concepts in set theory
Operations on sets